Falconara Airbase  is a joint-use civil airport and Italian Air Force (Aeronautica Militare) facility in Italy, located approximately 3 km west of Falconara Marittima in the province of Ancona, about 200 km north-northeast of Rome.

The airport is used for general aviation, with no commercial airline service.  Along with the Italian Air Force, It is also the headquarters of the Italian Army's 84th Infantry Battalion.

World War II
During World War II, Falconara Airfield was a military airfield used by the United States Army Air Forces Twelfth Air Force for B-25 Mitchell combat operations by the 321st Bombardment Group between 1 Apr and 1 Sep 1945. After the war ended, the airfield was turned over to local authorities.

References

Further reading
 Maurer, Maurer. Air Force Combat Units of World War II. Maxwell AFB, Alabama: Office of Air Force History, 1983. 521p. .

External links

Falconara
Airfields of the United States Army Air Forces in Italy
Falconara Marittima